Dębiny  is a village in the administrative district of Gmina Wilczęta, within Braniewo County, Warmian-Masurian Voivodeship, in northern Poland.

In 2005 the village had a population of 81.

References

Villages in Braniewo County